Ričice may refer to:

 Ričice, Lika-Senj County, a village near Lovinac, Croatia
 Ričice, Split-Dalmatia County, a village near Proložac, Croatia
 Ričice, Travnik, a village near Travnik